Intimacy refers to an intimate relationship between two people or among three or more people.

Intimacy may also refer to:

Physical intimacy, physical aspects of an intimate relationship
Emotional intimacy, emotional aspects of an intimate relationship

Literature
Intimacy (novel), a 1998 novel by Hanif Kureishi
"Intimacy", a short story by Jean-Paul Sartre collected in The Wall
"Intimacy", a short story by Raymond Carver

Film
Intimacy (1966 film), an American film
Intimacy (2001 film), a film by Patrice Chéreau, loosely based on the 1998 novel

Music
Intimacy (Jody Watley album) (1993)
Intimacy (Bruce Roberts album) (1995) or its title song
Intimacy (Matt Redman album) (1998) or its title song
Intimacy (Bloc Party album) (2008)
"Intimacy" (song), a 1988 song by Machinations

See also
Intimate (disambiguation)